The Deltic Preservation Society is a railway preservation group based in England. The society is dedicated to the preservation and restoration of the remaining Class 55 "Deltic" diesel locomotives operated by British Rail from the 1960s to the 1980s.

Formation
The Deltic Preservation Society (DPS) was founded in 1977 following the entry into service of the Class 43 High Speed Train. A group of Class 55 enthusiasts made the decision to join together to ensure that a working locomotive was kept running, forming the DPS to raise funds to this end. By 1982, when the Class 55 was withdrawn, the Society numbered over 1,500, with the result that it was able to purchase two locomotives, D9009/55009 (Alycidon) and D9019/55019 (Royal Highland Fusilier), from British Rail. These two units were moved immediately from Doncaster Works and put into service on the North Yorkshire Moors Railway. A third locomotive, D9015/55015 (Tulyar) was added to the inventory in 1986 when it was purchased from a private owner. For the first few years, the DPS provided its locomotives to run on a number of private railways. However, following a change of policy by British Rail in 1991, a few years before its privatisation, it became possible for private operators to run trains on the mainline rail network. With this in mind, the DPS sent Alycidon for a major overhaul, completed in 1998, which allowed the locomotive to gain a certification for running on the public railway. Royal Highland Fusilier was given a less extensive overhaul, receiving its certification at the same time. Both locomotives re-entered passenger service in May 1999, operating railtour services for the Society. At the same time, both were also used on many occasions by Venice-Simplon Orient Express to haul the Northern Belle charter train. In 1997, Tulyar was withdrawn from its private railway services and sent for an overhaul along the same lines as Alycidon to restore it to mainline service.

Royal Scots Grey
D9000/55022 Royal Scots Grey is a further preserved Class 55. Along with D9016/55016 Gordon Highlander, she was purchased by the Deltic 9000 Fund on withdrawal from British Rail service, and operated for several years on charters and railtours. In 2004, DNLL went into liquidation, with its locomotives sold. Royal Scots Grey was purchased by DPS member Martin Walker to be operated as a chartered locomotive for railtour operators. In 2009 Walker purchased Gordon Highlander reuniting the two locomotives. The two locomotives ran at the East Lancashire Railway for many years but have now left for other railways. In December 2017, both were sold to Locomotive Services.

Operations
Under the name 'DPS Railtours, the DPS operated railtours pulled by its Class 55 locomotives. It has also provided its locomotives to other railtour operators for their services.  In addition, under the name DPS Commercial Services, the DPS operates a depot at Barrow Hill near Chesterfield, where it contracts out to perform maintenance and repairs not only its own locomotives, but also the other preserved Class 55s, D9002/55002 (King's Own Yorkshire Light Infantry) (owned by the National Railway Museum) and D9000/55022 (Royal Scots Grey). In addition, the DPS also owns a preserved cab of D9008/55008 (The Green Howards), which has been converted into a simulator for the Trainz East Coast Main Line computer program. 

In August 2006, the DPS also obtained the cab of D9021/55021 (Argyll and Sutherland Highlander), which it intends to restore and put on display at its depot; however, the cab has now left the DPS depot and is now part of The South Wales Loco Cab Preservation Group.

See also
 Railway enthusiasts societies in the United Kingdom

References

Engineering preservation societies
Preservation Society